Diiodine oxide, also known as iodohypoiodite, is an oxide of iodine that is equivalent to an acid anhydride of hypoiodous acid.  This substance is unstable and it is very difficult to isolate.

Preparation 
Diiodine oxide can be prepared by reacting iodine with potassium iodate (KIO3) in 96% sulfuric acid and then extracting it into chlorinated solvents.

Reaction 
Diiodine oxide reacts with water to form hypoiodous acid:

Related substances 

 Oxygen difluoride
 Dichlorine monoxide
 Dibromine monoxide

References 

Iodine compounds
Oxides